Civil Aviation Department, Haryana is a Ministry and department of the Government of Haryana in India.

History

This department was created when after 1966 Haryana was established as a new state within India after being separated from Punjab. It is responsible for the Haryana Institute of Civil Aviation, five Civil Aviation airports in the state of Haryana and has bought simulators for the flying training. The department is undertaking expansion of civil aviation facilities at Hisar Airport.

Air Crafts
The dept acquired a Textron Aviation (formerly known as Beech Craft) in January 2019 at the cost of INR42 crore, to be housed at Chandigarh Airport and flown by two pilots on deputation from BSF for 3 years.

Airports in Haryana

Civil airports

Existing 
 Bhiwani Airport
 Gurugram Airport
 Hisar Airport
 Pinjore Airport
 Karnal Flying Club
 Narnaul Airport

Planned-greenfield 
 Ambala Airport, next to Ambala Airforce Station Airport
 Chhara Airport (Jhajjar district) on Jhajjar-Sampla road,
 Jind Airport (Narwana)
 Kurukshetra Airport 
 Meham Cargo Airport

Planned (in gap areas, not yet surveyed/approved) 
 Sirsa Air Force Station civil enclave or Odhan Airport (greenfield)
 Bahal Airport in Bidhwan-Bahal-Isharwal-Kairu area, 80-100 km from airports at Hisar, Bhiwani, Narnaul
 Punhana Airport, 70 km from planned airports at Bhiwadi (Rajasthan) and Jewar (UP)
 Charki Dadri Airport in Charki Dadri-Palri-Nahar-Kairu area, 65-90 km from airports at Chhara (future), Behal (future), Narnaul (existing)
 Fatehabad Airport, in Ratia-Bhirdana-Bhuna area

Military airports

With civil enclave 
 Ambala Air Force Station

Without civil enclave 
 Sirsa Air Force Station
established in 1976

Airports around Haryana

Major international airports (clockwise) 
 Chandigarh Airport
 IGI Airport at Delhi
 Jewar Airport (Taj/Noida/Agra Airport) at Jewar in UP across the border from Palwal in Haryana, under construction
 Jaipur Airport

Other airports (clockwise) 
 Punjab
 Bathinda Airport, 100 km north of Sirsa Airforce Station, 175 km northwest of Hisar airport
 Ludhiana Sahnewal Airport, 125 km northwest of Ambala Airforce Station
 Ludhiana Halwara Air Force Station, 125 km northwest of Ambala Airforce Station
 Patiala Airport, 45 km west of Ambala Airforce Station, 80 km northwest of Kurukshetra airport (future), 110 km northwest of Karnal airport, 110 km northwest of Uchana (Narwana-Jind) future airport, 

 Himachal Pradesh
 Shimla Airport, 100 km northeast of airports at Chandigarh and Pinjore
 Mandi Airport, 180 km northeast of airports at Chandigarh and Pinjore
 Kullu Bhuntar Airport, 200 km northeast of airports at Chandigarh and Pinjore
 Kangra Gaggal Airport, 250 km northeast of airports at Chandigarh and Pinjore

 Uttarakhand
 Chinyalisaur Maa Ganga Airport, 240-260 km northeast of airports at Chandigarh, Pinjore, Ambala and Karnal
 Dehradun Jolly Grant Airport, 160-170 km northeast of airports at Chandigarh, Pinjore, Ambala and Karnal

 Uttar Pradesh
 Sarsawa Air Force Station at Saharanpur without civil enclave, 70-80 km east from airports at Karnal (existing) and Kurukshetra (future), 100 km east from existing Pinjore and Chandigarh airports 
 Meerut Dr. Bhimrao Ambedkar Airstrip, 110 km east from airports at Karnal (existing) and Chhara (future)
 Hindon Airport civil enclave at Ghaziabad in NCR
 Moradabad Airport, upcoming airport 130 km east of Delhi
 Aligarh Airport, upcoming airport 130 km southeast of Delhi, 65 km from Jewar, 100 km from Punhana

 Rajasthan
 Suratgarh Air Force Station, airport 130 km west of Sirsa Airforce Station, 200 km northwest of Hisar airport
 Bikaner Nal Airport, 275 km further west of Suratgarh
 Phalodi Air Force Station, 150 km further west of Bikaner airport and 425 km further west of Suratgarh airport
 Ganganagar	Lalgarh Airport, 120 km northwest of Sirsa Airforce Station, 200 km northwest of Hisar airport

See also
 Highways in Haryana
 Railway in Haryana

References

Civil aviation in India
Economy of Haryana
Government departments of Haryana
Civil aviation authorities in Asia
Aviation organisations based in India